The Academy of Canadian Cinema and Television presents an annual award for Best Comedy Series. Formerly presented as part of the Gemini Awards program, since 2013 the award has been presented as part of the expanded Canadian Screen Awards.

1980s

1990s

2000s

2010s

2020s

Multiple awards and nominations

References

External links
 

Comedy series